Euchroma giganteum, the Metallic Wood Boring Beetle  or Giant Metallic Ceiba Borer, is a species of beetle in the family Buprestidae, the only species in the genus Euchroma.

Subspecies
Euchroma giganteum giganteum (Linnaeus, 1758)
Euchroma giganteum goliath (Laporte & Gory, 1836)
Euchroma giganteum harperi Sharp, 1881
Euchroma giganteum incum Obenberger, 1928
Euchroma giganteum peruanum Obenberger, 1928

Description

Catoxantha and Megaloxantha are among the few other members of the family that reach a comparable size.

The body of E. giganteum is robust and elongated and the elytra have a wrinkled surface and a metallic green colour with reddish or purplish tinges. The pronotum has a dark spot on each side. The elytra of  newly emerged adults have a coating of a yellowish, waxy powder. As the beetle ages this powder wear off.

Behavior
The males apparently attract the females by a clicking sound produced by the elytra. This species usually mates in August. The larvae are miners of fallen timber, while  adults are usually found walking around on the trunks of trees.

Diet
Larvae feed on decaying timber, especially of the Bombacaceae family (kapok or ceiba trees, mainly Ceiba pentandra , Bombacopsis spp., Ochroma spp. and Pseudobombax spp.), but also of Araucaria angustifolia and Ficus species.

Distribution and habitat
This species is native to Central and South America (Mexico, Panama, Ecuador, Cuba, Jamaica, Peru, Brazil, Colombia, Argentina y Venezuela (Guarenas-Naranjal)).

Gallery

References

External links
 God of insects
 Living Jewels

Buprestidae
Beetles described in 1758
Taxa named by Carl Linnaeus